The 2018 PBA D-League Foundation Cup is the second conference of the 2018 PBA Developmental League season. The tournament opened on June 4, 2018 at the Ynares Sports Arena, Pasig.

Teams

Tournament format 
 Six teams will play in a single round-robin elimination phase. 
 Only the top four teams will only make it to the playoffs after the elimination round.
 Top 2 teams will get a twice-to-beat semifinals incentives.
 The Semifinals and the Championship will both be contested in a best-of-3 series.

Team standings

These are the team standings at the end of the elimination round:

Schedule

Results

Playoffs

Awards

References

External links
Official website

Foundation Cup
2018
2017–18 in Philippine basketball leagues